Tom Charles Bayley Foxon FRS is a British physicist, and emeritus professor at the University of Nottingham.

References

British physicists
Academics of the University of Nottingham
Fellows of the Royal Society
Living people
Year of birth missing (living people)